Events in the year 2011 in Slovakia.

Incumbents 
 President – Ivan Gašparovič 
 Prime Minister – Iveta Radičová
 Speaker of the National Council – Richard Sulík, Pavol Hrušovský

Events

28 December – The 2011 Kosice McDonald's bombing.

Film
14 April – Apricot Island released
7 July – Gypsy released.
13 October – Lóve released

Notable deaths

20 January – Vladimír Kompánek, sculptor and painter (born 1927)
7 May – Milan Mišík, geologist (born 1928)
27 July – Rudolf Baláž, bishop (born 1940).

References

 
2010s in Slovakia
Slovakia
Slovakia
Years of the 21st century in Slovakia